The Nicaragua cross-banded tree frog or tawny smilisca (Smilisca puma) is a species of tree frog in the family Hylidae. Its natural habitats are tropical moist lowland forests. It breeds in small, shallow temporary pools or ponds, including those in very disturbed habitats, such as pastures. Males call during the rainy season from shallow water and low bushes. Habitat loss and degradation caused by small- and large-scale agriculture and logging are threats to this species.

References

Smilisca
Frogs of North America
Amphibians of Costa Rica
Amphibians of Nicaragua
Amphibians described in 1885
Taxonomy articles created by Polbot